The Mountain West Athletic Conference (MWAC) was a women's college athletic conference in the western 

Launched in the summer of 1982, it existed for six years, until it was merged into the Big Sky Conference in 1988. Founded in 1963, the Big Sky was for men's sports only for its first quarter century.

The Pac-10 Conference had a similar arrangement, with the Northern Pacific Conference and Western Collegiate Athletic Association for women's sports. Each had five Pac-10 members plus several others; the Pac-10 added women's sports in 1986. Similarly, the Western Athletic Conference (WAC) had the "High Country Athletic Conference" for women's sports until 1990, and the Missouri Valley Conference was tied with the Gateway Collegiate Athletic Conference until 1992 (the Gateway would transform into the modern-day Missouri Valley Football Conference).

Members

Boise State
Idaho
Idaho State
Montana
Montana State
Eastern Washington
Weber State
Portland State (departed in 1986)
Nevada (joined in 1987)
Northern Arizona (joined in 1987)

Source:

References

Defunct NCAA Division I conferences
Big Sky Conference
Sports in the Western United States
Sports leagues established in 1982
Sports leagues disestablished in 1988
1982 establishments in the United States
College sports in Idaho
College sports in Montana
College sports in Washington (state)
College sports in Oregon
College sports in Utah
College sports in Nevada
College sports in Arizona
1988 disestablishments in the United States